The 1995 Welsh Cup Final, was the 108th in the competition. It was contested by Wrexham and Cardiff City at the Cardiff Arms Park, Cardiff.

Route to the Final

Wrexham

Cardiff City

Final

References

1995
1994–95 in Welsh football
Wrexham A.F.C. matches
Cardiff City F.C. matches
May 1995 sports events in the United Kingdom